Mount Burnham is a mountain in California.

Mount Burnham may also refer to:

Mount Burnham (Marie Byrd Land), Antarctica
Mount Burnham (Oates Land), Antarctica
Mount Burnham (Victoria Land), Antarctica
Mount Burnham (British Columbia), Canada